Anal stricture or anal stenosis is a narrowing of the anal canal. It can be caused by a number of surgical procedures including: hemorrhoid removal and following anorectal wart treatment.

References

Colorectal surgery